The Dominguez–Wilshire Building is located at 5410 Wilshire Boulevard in the Miracle Mile district of Los Angeles, an Art Deco landmark.

The property was named after its developers, the Dominguez family, the heirs to the first land grant given in California by King Carlos III of Spain.

The project architects were Morgan, Walls & Clements.

Art Deco architecture in California
Buildings and structures in Los Angeles
Mid-Wilshire, Los Angeles